Operation Quicksilver  may refer to:

Operation Quicksilver (deception plan), a World War II plan by the Allied nations threatening an invasion at Pas de Calais
Operation Quicksilver (1978), an American nuclear test series of eighteen blasts conducted at the Nevada Test Site in 1978 and 1979
Operation Quicksilver (1990s), a plan to reduce the size of the United States Army in the early 1990s as a result of the end of the Cold War